The Solitaire du Figaro, previously called the Course de l'Aurore, is a solo multi-stage sailing race created in 1970 by Jean-Louis Guillemard and . The unique character of the race, the presence of great solo sailors and its being open to amateurs, has made it one of the most cherished races in French sailing.

History 
From 1970 to 1979 the race was organised by the newspaper L'Aurore. In 1980 the daily newspaper Le Figaro bought out L'Aurore and became the principal sponsor of the event.

From 2003, the eyewear company  was an associate sponsor. The official name of the race became La Solitaire Afflelou Le Figaro. Since 2008, the motor manufacturer Suzuki replaced them, and the race became named La Solitaire du Figaro Suzuki.

Since 2011 the title sponsor of the race has been Éric Bompard Cachemire, a French fashion house specialising in cashmere garments.

The characteristics of the race are:
 It starts around the end of July from a French port.
Over the years the race has lasted between 10 and 13 days at sea.
 The competitor is alone in the boat, participation is mixed.
 Since 1990, all boats are of one design.

Boats 
In early races, boats were all from the same series. Since 1980, the race used prototype half-tonners.

In 1991, the Solitaire du Figaro made the milestone of becoming a One-Design race. The race organisers chose the Bénéteau Figaro (later called the Figaro Bénéteau I) designed by Group Finot and Jean Berret.

Since 2003, a new design called Bénéteau Figaro 2 has been used, a modernised, more powerful version.

Past winners

Results 
All places are in France unless otherwise stated.

2003 
 1st stage: Les Sables-d'Olonne – Getxo/Bilbao (Spain)
 2nd stage: Getxo/Bilbao – La Rochelle
 3rd stage: La Rochelle – Dingle (Ireland)
 4th stage: Dingle – Saint-Nazaire – 1979 nmi

 Overall results:
 Armel Le Cléac'h (Créaline) in 327h 08min 19s
 Alain Gautier (Foncia) +13s
 Michel Desjoyeaux (Géant) +1h 26min 17s

42 skippers started, 42 finished.

2004 
 1st stage: Caen – Portsmouth (England)
 2nd stage: Portsmouth – Saint-Gilles-Croix-de-Vie
 3rd stage: Saint-Gilles-Croix-de-Vie – Gijón (Spain)
 4th stage: Gijon – Quiberon – 1373 nmi

51 competitors.

 Overall results:
 Charles Caudrelier (Bostik Findley) in 220h 53min 54s
  (Groupe Generali Assurances) +52min 35s
 Jérémie Beyou (Delta Dore) +1h 24min 35s

52 skippers started, 52 finished.

2005 
1st stage: Perros-Guirec – Getxo-Bilbao (Spain) – 390 nmi
 2nd stage: Getxo-Bilbao – La Rochelle – 368 nmi
 3rd stage: La Rochelle – Cork (Ireland) – 456 nmi
 4th stage: Cork – Talmont-Saint-Hilaire – 496 nmi

 Overall results:
 Jérémie Beyou  (Delta Dore) in 248h 49min 20s
 Michel Desjoyeaux  (Géant) +1h 20min 54s
 Kito de Pavant  (Groupe Bel) +1h 58min 41s
 Gildas Morvan  (Cercle Vert) +2h 17min 9s
   (Groupe Generali Assurances) +2h 24min 22s
   (Cliptol Sport) +2h 29min 45s
   (Brossard) +2h 35min 53s
 Pietro d'Ali  (Nanni Diesel) +3h 5min 12s, first newcomer
   (Thales) +3h 13min 3s
 Charles Caudrelier  (Bostik) +3h 18min 57s

46 skippers started, 42 finished.

2006 
1st stage: Cherbourg-Octeville – Santander (Spain) – 590 nmi
2nd stage: Santander – Saint-Gilles-Croix-de-Vie – 314 nmi
3rd stage: Saint-Gilles-Croix-de-Vie – Dingle (Ireland) – 549 nmi
4th stage: Dingle – Concarneau – 449 nmi

Started 6 August 2006, with 44 competitors.

 Overall results:
 Nicolas Troussel  (Financo) in 297h 01min 56s
   (Littoral) +1h 56min 55s
   (Scutum) +3h 55min 28s
 Armel Le Cléac'h  (Brit Air) +5h 20min 20s
   (Groupe Generali assurances) +6h 33min 07s
 Charles Caudrelier  (Bostik) +6h 57min 50s
   (Iceberg Finance) +6h 58min 36s
 Oliver Krauss  (AXA Plaisance) +7h 21min 53s
 Eric Drouglazet  (Pixmania.com) +7h 49min 08s
 Kito de Pavant  (Groupe Bel) +7h 58min 03s

2007 
Started 29 July 2007, with 50 competitors.
 1st stage: Caen – Crosshaven (Ireland) – 425 nmi
 2nd stage: Crosshaven- Brest – 344 nmi
 3rd stage: Brest – A Coruña (Spain) – (shortened to 542 nmi)
 4th stage: A Coruña – Les Sables-d'Olonne – 355 nmi

 Overall results:
 Michel Desjoyeaux  (Foncia) in 247h 20min 47sec
   (Distinxion) +26 min 38s
   (Leclerc/Bouygues Telecom) +1h 03min 50s
 Nicolas Troussel  (Financo) +1h 41min 26s
   (Le Comptoir Immobilier) +2h 14min 23s
 Eric Drouglazet  (Luisina) +2h 39min 05s
 Gérald Veniard  (Scutum) +3h 16min 53s
 Gildas Morvan  (Cercle Vert) +3h 19min 48s
 Thomas Rouxel  (Défi Mousquetaires) +3h 29min 34s
   (Rapid’Flore Caen-La-Mer) +4h 01min 11s

 in Bostik finished first newcomer in 14th place.

2008 
Started 25 July 2008, with 50 competitors.
 1st stage: La Rochelle – Vigo (Spain) – shortened to 320 nmi
 2nd stage: Vigo – Cherbourg-Octeville – 575 nmi
 3rd stage: Cherbourg-Octeville – l'Aber Wrac'h – (shortened to 471 nmi)

 Overall results:
 Nicolas Troussel  (Financo) in 226h 32min 51sec
 Gildas Morvan  (Cercle Vert) +2h 22min 15sec
   (Distinxion) +3h 34min 38s
   (Athema) +3h 53min 57sec
   (Banque Populaire) +4h 54min 50sec
   (DCNS 97) 4h 55min 37s
   (KONE Ascenceurs) +5h 03min 54s
   (Le Comptoir Immobilier) +5h 52min 27s
   (Docteur Valnet aromathérapie) +5h 52min 46s
   (SUZUKI Automobiles) +6h 23min 08s

François Gabart in Espoir Région Bretagne finished first newcomer in 16th place.

Nicolas Troussel won a race marked by a windless first stage in which he "" ("killed the race", leading to the neologism "Do a Troussel", in ) by arriving six hours ahead. It was his second victory in the race.

2009 
Started 30 July 2009 for the 40th race, with 52 competitors.
 1st stage: Lorient – A Coruña (Spain) – 345 nmi
 2nd stage: A Coruña – Saint-Gilles-Croix-de-Vie 365 nmi
 3rd stage: Saint-Gilles-Croix-de-Vie- Dingle (Ireland) – 485 nmi
 4th stage: Dingle- Dieppe – 511 nmi

 Overall results:
  (CGPI) in 285h 56min 55s
  (Generali) +20min 29s
  (Bbox Bouygues Télécom) +26min 14s

2017 
Starting on 4 June 2017 from Pauillac, France the 48th edition of the race commenced with 43 competitors:

36 French, 3 British, 1 Swiss, 1 Turkish, 1 Czech and 1 American – a split of 37 men and 6 women skippers took on the challenge.

 1st stage: Pauillac – Gijon (Spain) – 525 nmi
 2nd stage: Gijon – Concarneau – 520 nmi
 3rd stage: Concarneau – Concarneau – 120 nmi
 4th stage: Concarneau – Dieppe – 505 nmi
 Overall results:
  (Generali) in 247h 8min 52s
 Adrien Hardy (Agir Recouvrement) +34min 32s
 Charlie Dalin (Skipper Macif 2015) +22min 29s
 Rookie prize – Julien Pulve (Team Vendee Formation) in 249h 44min 45s
 Amateur prize – Hugh Brayshaw (The Offshore Academy) in 253h 57min 28s

References

External links 
 Official website

Sailing competitions in France
Sailing competitions in Spain
Sailing competitions in Ireland
Single-handed sailing competitions